Baba Yaga is a supernatural creature in Slavic mythology, appearing as an old or deformed woman.

Baba Yaga may also refer to:

Characters
Baba Yaga (Dungeons & Dragons), a powerful antagonist in the fantasy role playing game Dungeons & Dragons 
Baba Yaga, a character from the video game series Castlevania
Baba Yaga, a character in the comic book series Fables
Baba Yaga (Hellboy), a character in the Hellboy comic series and the 2019 film Hellboy
Baba Yaga, a character in the novel series Lord Marksman and Vanadis
"Baba Yaga", a nickname for the character John Wick
Baba Yaga, a witch who eats children in the animated film Secret Magic Control Agency

Films and television
Baba Yaga (film), a 1973 Italian-French erotic thriller directed by Corrado Farina
Baba Yaga: Terror of the Dark Forest, a 2020 Russian horror film
"Baba Yaga", the first episode of the 1989 TV series Valentina (TV series)
Baba Yaga, a 2021 animated film directed by Eric Darnell

Other uses
Baba Yaga (album), a 1999 studio album by Norwegian musician Annbjørg Lien
"The Baba Yaga", a story in the comic book Hellboy: The Chained Coffin and Others
Baba Yaga: The Temple of the Witch, a playable bonus level of the video game Rise of the Tomb Raider
Baba-Yaga, symphonic poem by Anatoly Liadov (1904)

See also

 Baba (disambiguation)
 Yaga (disambiguation)